Tarik Daniel Skubal (born November 20, 1996) is an American professional baseball pitcher for the Detroit Tigers of Major League Baseball (MLB).

Amateur career
Skubal attended Kingman Academy of Learning in Kingman, Arizona and played college baseball at Seattle University. He missed most of the 2016 season and all of 2017 after undergoing Tommy John surgery. Despite the injury, he was drafted by the Arizona Diamondbacks in the 29th round of the 2017 Major League Baseball draft, but did not sign and returned to Seattle. He was then drafted by the Detroit Tigers in the ninth round of the 2018 MLB draft and signed.

Professional career
Skubal spent his first professional season with the Gulf Coast Tigers, Connecticut Tigers and West Michigan Whitecaps, pitching to a combined 3–0 record and 0.40 ERA in 22.1 innings pitched. He started 2019 with the Lakeland Flying Tigers. He would impress throughout the season and earn a call-up to the Erie SeaWolves on July 5. Over his first three starts with Erie, he held a 0.56 ERA with 34 strikeouts and giving up just five hits in sixteen innings. His performances over the season would earn him a jump in the MLB.com 2019 Prospect Watch from a preseason #20 ranking in the Tigers' organization to a #4 spot at the midseason update on July 27. He would finish the season at the Double-A level with a 2–3 record, 2.13 ERA, 1.02 WHIP, and with opponents hitting just .168 off him. Overall in 2019 (two minor league levels), Skubal struck out 179 batters in only  innings.

The Tigers invited Skubal to spring training in 2020. On August 18, 2020, Skubal was recalled from the Tigers' satellite training facility in Toledo, and he made his MLB debut later that day. On August 29, 2020, Skubal earned his first major league win against the Minnesota Twins. In five innings pitched, Skubal allowed two earned runs and three hits while striking out two and walking none in the Tigers' 4–2 win. With the 2020 Detroit Tigers, Skubal appeared in 8 games, compiling a 1–4 record with 5.63 ERA and 37 strikeouts in 32.0 innings pitched. His cutter, which averaged , was the fastest cutter of any major league pitcher for the 2020 season.

On March 24, 2021, new Tigers manager A. J. Hinch announced that Skubal had made the Opening Day roster out of spring training, and would be part of the Tigers' starting rotation. On July 3, Skubal recorded his 100th strikeout of the season in a game against the Chicago White Sox, becoming the first Tiger rookie in franchise history to strike out 100 or more batters before the All-Star break. In an August 25 game against the St. Louis Cardinals, Skubal recorded strikeouts for the first six outs of the game, finishing with ten strikeouts in five innings of work. On September 25 against the Kansas City Royals, Skubal reached 200 career strikeouts in his first 38 appearances, which is faster than any pitcher in Tigers franchise history. Overall in 2021, Skubal made 31 appearances (29 starts), posting an 8–12 record and 4.34 ERA while striking out 164 batters in  innings.

Skubal began the 2022 season in the Tigers starting rotation. After posting a 7–8 record with a 3.52 ERA, 111 ERA+, 1.16 WHIP and 117 strikeouts in  innings, he was placed on the injured list August 3 with left arm fatigue. On August 17, the Tigers announced Skubal had undergone flexor tendon surgery that would shut down his 2022 season and could possibly affect the start of his 2023 season.

On March 14, 2023, the Tigers moved Skubal to the 60-day injured list, stating that he isn't expected back until the summer, following last year's flexor tendon surgery.

Pitch selection
Skubal throws both four-seam and sinking two-seam fastballs, each averaging 94 to 96 MPH (topping out at 100 MPH). His main offspeed pitch is a slider that averages 87 to 89 MPH. He also throws a changeup averaging 83 MPH and an occasional curveball averaging 76 MPH.

Personal life 
Skubal's father Russ is a middle school science teacher and basketball coach.  His mother, Laura Skubal, is a development services employee with Mohave County, Arizona. He has three brothers: Treyvor, Tyler, and Trent.

References

External links

1996 births
Living people
Baseball players from California
Connecticut Tigers players
Detroit Tigers players
Erie SeaWolves players
Gulf Coast Tigers players
Lakeland Flying Tigers players
Major League Baseball pitchers
Seattle Redhawks baseball players
Sportspeople from Hayward, California
West Michigan Whitecaps players